Private First Class Dewayne Thomas Williams (September 18, 1949 – September 18, 1968) was a United States Marine who posthumously received the Medal of Honor for heroism in the Vietnam War in September 1968.

On September 18, 1968, Williams's 19th birthday, his unit participated in a patrol to destroy enemy sniper positions in Quang Nam Province. Suddenly, Williams's unit was ambushed by North Vietnamese forces. Williams was wounded early in the skirmish, but still attempted to fire back at the enemies. When a grenade came close to another Marine, Williams jumped onto it, sacrificing himself.

Biography
Dewayne Williams was born on September 18, 1949, in Brown City, Michigan. He attended Bell Elementary School, St. Clair Elementary, Intermediate, and High Schools in St. Clair, Michigan, and Capac High School, in Capac, Michigan.

On December 18, 1967, Williams enlisted in the Marine Corps Reserve, and was discharged to enlist in the active Marine Corps on January 2, 1968. He completed recruit training with the 3rd Recruit Training Battalion, Marine Corps Recruit Depot San Diego in March 1968; individual combat training with Company Y, 3rd Battalion, 2nd Infantry Training Regiment, Marine Corps Base Camp Pendleton, in April; and weapons training with Weapons Company, Basic Infantry Training Battalion, 2nd Infantry Training Regiment at Camp Pendleton, in May 1968.

Williams was promoted to private first class on June 1, 1968. Upon his arrival in the Republic of Vietnam later that month, he was assigned duty as automatic rifleman with Company I, 3rd Battalion, 27th Marines, 1st Marine Division, and served in this capacity until August 1968. He was then assigned duty as anti-tank assault man with Company H, 2nd Battalion 1st Marines. On September 18, 1968, he was killed in action while on patrol in the Quảng Nam Province.

Awards and honors
Williams awards include:
 

The Military Sealift Command maritime Prepositioning ship, is named in his honor.
Dewayne T. Williams's name can be found inscribed on Vietnam Veterans Memorial on Panel 43W, Row 025.
The portion of Interstate 69 beginning at the eastern city limit of the city of Lapeer, Michigan and extending east to the western city limit of the city of Port Huron, Michigan is known as the "DeWayne T. Williams Memorial Highway".

Medal of Honor citation

See also

List of Medal of Honor recipients
List of Medal of Honor recipients for the Vietnam War

References

1949 births
1968 deaths
United States Marine Corps Medal of Honor recipients
Military personnel from Michigan
United States Marines
American military personnel killed in the Vietnam War
People from St. Clair, Michigan
Vietnam War recipients of the Medal of Honor
People from Brown City, Michigan
Deaths by hand grenade
United States Marine Corps personnel of the Vietnam War